Sabatham is 1971 Indian Tamil-language romantic drama film, directed by P. Madhavan and written by Bala Murugan. Music was by G. K. Venkatesh. The film stars K. R. Vijaya, Ravichandran, Nagesh and T. K. Bhagavathi, with V. K. Ramasami and Anjali Devi in supporting roles. It was released on 14 April 1971.

Plot 

Sivakami makes a gentle challenge to her father-in-law, as to how she should manage her problems in the household.

Cast 
 K. R. Vijaya as Sivakami
 Ravichandran as Muthu
 T. K. Bhagavathi as Selva Nayagam and Durai Singam
 Nagesh as Shanmugam
 V. K. Ramasamy as Rangaiya
 S. V. Sahasranamam as Valli Muthu
 Anjali Devi as Rajeswari
 Pandari Bai as Lakshmi
 Neelu
 K. R. Indira Devi as Yesotha
 Indra
 C. R. Rajakumari
 Bhavani
 Sridevi as Krishnan
 L. Vijayalakshmi as Draupadi

Production 
The film features a play based on the Mahabharata, where Sridevi plays Krishna.

Soundtrack 
Music was composed by G. K. Venkatesh and lyrics were written by Kannadasan. The song "Thoduvandhenna Thendralo Malargalo" was inspired in part by the Hindi song "Woh Hain Zara Khafa Khafa" from Shagird (1967), and attained popularity. The song "Aattathai Aadu Puliyudan" also attained popularity.

References

External links 
 

1970s romantic comedy-drama films
1970s Tamil-language films
1971 films
Films about brothers
Films about women in India
Films directed by P. Madhavan
Films scored by G. K. Venkatesh
Indian black-and-white films
Indian feminist films
Indian romantic comedy-drama films
Twins in Indian films